Marry the Girl is a 1935 British comedy film directed by Maclean Rogers, who wrote the script.  It is a screen adaption of the original 1930 Aldwych farce Marry the Girl, written by George Arthurs and Arthur Miller.

Nine of the twelve Aldwych plays had been adapted for film by 1935, with some of the leading roles played by members of the original stage company. Eight of these films were directed by Tom Walls and one by Jack Raymond.  The production companies for the earlier films in the series were British & Dominions Film Corporation and Gaumont British. Marry the Girl, however, was filmed by British Lion Films with none of the original stars, except for Winifred Shotter reprising her stage role. It was made at Beaconsfield Studios with sets designed by Norman G. Arnold.

Plot
Wally Gibbs is sued for breach of promise by his former girlfriend Doris Chattaway. His current fiancée, Jane Elliott, breaks off their engagement. Wally ends up with Doris, and Jane pairs off with Wally's friend Hugh Delafield, who has been the Counsel for the Plaintiff in the lawsuit.

Cast
Sonnie Hale as Wally Gibbs 
 Winifred Shotter as Doris Chattaway
 Hugh Wakefield as Hugh Delafield 
 Judy Kelly as Jane Elliott
 C. Denier Warren as Banks
 Kenneth Kove as Cyril Chattaway 
 Maidie Hope as Mrs Elliott 
 Wally Patch as Bookmaker 
 John Deverell as Judge 
 Lawrence Anderson as Counsel for the defence
Source: British Film Institute

References

Bibliography
 Low, Rachael. Filmmaking in 1930s Britain. George Allen & Unwin, 1985.
 Wood, Linda. British Films, 1927-1939. British Film Institute, 1986.

External links
 

1935 comedy films
1935 films
Aldwych farce
British comedy films
British films based on plays
Films set in England
Films directed by Maclean Rogers
Films shot at Beaconsfield Studios
British Lion Films films
British black-and-white films
1930s English-language films
1930s British films